Foggy Notions was an independently published Irish music magazine founded by Leagues O' Toole and Myles Claffey, which focused on the more esoteric elements of electronica, indie, and folk music.

History and profile
Foggy Notions was established in 2004. Artists such as Mark E Smith, Skream, The Flaming Lips, and Joanna Newsom were interviewed by the magazine, and featured on the cover. The magazine was based in Dublin. It ceased publication in 2007.

References

External links
 

Folk music magazines
Music magazines published in Ireland
Magazines established in 2004
Magazines disestablished in 2007
Defunct magazines published in Ireland